The NFCA National Player of the Year is an award given by Schutt Sports to the best college softball player of the year. The award has been given annually since 2016. In 2019, the award was split into two honors, the player and pitchers of the year. The award is voted on by the members of the NFCA's NCAA Division I All-American Committee.

Winners

Player of the Year (2016–present)

Pitcher of the Year (2019–present)

References

Awards established in 2016
College softball player of the year awards in the United States